José Ignacio Duarte Murillo (born 9 September 1965) is a Mexican politician affiliated with the PRI. He currently serves as Deputy of the LXII Legislature of the Mexican Congress representing Chihuahua.

References

1965 births
Living people
People from Ciudad Juárez
Institutional Revolutionary Party politicians
20th-century Mexican politicians
21st-century Mexican politicians
Politicians from Chihuahua (state)
Monterrey Institute of Technology and Higher Education alumni
Members of the Congress of Chihuahua
Deputies of the LXII Legislature of Mexico
Members of the Chamber of Deputies (Mexico) for Chihuahua (state)